4,4’-Dinitro-3,3’-diazenofuroxan (DDF) is a powerful experimental high explosive with performance comparable to that of other high-density high-explosives such as octanitrocubane. It is synthesised by oxidative coupling of 4-amino-3-(azidocarbonyl)furoxan followed by Curtius rearrangement and further oxidation.

See also
3,3′‐Diamino‐4,4′‐azoxyfurazan (DAAF)
2,4,6-Tris(trinitromethyl)-1,3,5-triazine
ONC
Hexanitrohexaazaisowurtzitane
HNC
HHTDD

References

Explosive chemicals
Nitro compounds
Amine oxides
Azo compounds